Ḥamāsah (from Arabic حماسة  valour) is a well-known ten-book anthology of Arabic poetry, compiled in the 9th century by Abu Tammam. Along with the Asma'iyyat, Mufaddaliyat, Jamharat Ash'ar al-Arab, and Mu'allaqat, Hamasah is considered one of the primary sources of early Arabic poetry. The work is especially important for having been the first Arabic anthology compiled by a poet and not a philologist and is the first in the Hamasah literary genre. The first and largest section of the work, al-ḥamāsah (valour), provides the name for several other anthologies of this type.

The anthology contains a total of 884 poems, most of which are short extracts of longer poems, grouped by subject matter. The selections date back to pre-Islamic, Islamic and early 'Abbasid times.

The Ḥamāsah was probably compiled around AD 835, while Abū Tammām was staying at Hamadan in Iran, where he had access to a very good library. It quickly acquired the status of a classic work. 
Saladin is said to have known it by heart.

Content
The ten headings are:

Al-Ḥamāsah “Valour”
Al-Marāthī, “Elegies”; 
Al-Adab, “Proper conduct”; 
An-Nasīb, “Love”; 
Al-Hijāʿ, “Invective”; 
Al-Adyāf wa al-madīḥ, “Hospitality and praise of the generous”; 
Aṣ-Ṣifāt, “Descriptive verses/pieces”; 
As-Sayr wa an-Nuʾas, “desert travel”; 
Al-Mulah, “Clever curiosities”; 
Madhammāt an-nisaʾ, “the censure of women”

See also
Kitab al-Aghani
Mu'allaqat
Mufaddaliyat

Further reading
"Abū Tammām and the Poetics of the ʿAbbāsid Age". - Suzanne Pinckney Stetkevych (1991)

References

External links 
 Article in Britannica

9th-century Arabic books
9th-century poems
Abbasid literature
Arabic anthologies

Medieval Arabic poems